Colotis evenina, the common orange tip, is a butterfly of the family Pieridae. It is found in the Afrotropical realm.

Description and habits
The wingspan is 38–45 mm in males and 35–42 mm in females. The adults fly year-round.

The larvae feed on Boscia albitrunca and Capparis species.

Subspecies
The following subspecies are recognised:
C. e. evenina — Mozambique, southern and eastern Zimbabwe, Botswana, Namibia, South Africa, Eswatini, Lesotho
C. e. sipylus (Swinhoe, 1884) — coast of Kenya, Tanzania, northern Zimbabwe
C. e. xantholeuca (Sharpe, 1904) — southern Uganda, central and south-western Kenya, central, northern and western Tanzania
C. e. casta (Gerstaecker, 1871) — northern Zimbabwe, Zambia, Democratic Republic of the Congo, Mozambique, Malawi, Tanzania, northern Kenya, Ethiopia, Somalia

References

External links
Images representing Colotis evenina at BOLD

Butterflies described in 1857
evenina